Blaby is a local government district in Leicestershire, England.

The district is named after Blaby. The population of the district at the 2011 census was 93,915.   It covers the civil parish of Blaby and 23 others. Among these are Cosby, Countesthorpe, Enderby, Huncote, Narborough (the location of the main district council offices), Sapcote, Stoney Stanton, and Wigston Parva. Much of the district is part of the Leicester Urban Area: this applies especially to the parishes of Braunstone Town (including the commuter housing development of Thorpe Astley); Glenfield (the location of County Hall, the home of Leicestershire County Council); Kirby Muxloe; Leicester Forest East; and Glen Parva. There are plans to extend this urban area significantly through a large scale housing development, in the rural parish of Lubbesthorpe, and expansion of the industrial area in the neighbouring parish of Enderby.

Blaby was represented in Parliament by the former Chancellor of the Exchequer, Nigel Lawson, between 1974 and 1992.

History
The district traces its origins to the Blaby Poor Law Union, which was founded in 1834.  It became a rural district of Leicestershire in 1894.  Oadby was removed in 1913 to form an urban district.  1935 saw parts being transferred to Leicester, whilst it took in part of the abolished Hinckley Rural District.  In 1974, under the Local Government Act 1972, the area was reconstituted as a non-metropolitan district.

In 1994 a new development within Braunstone Town, Thorpe Astley, was built over the course of 15 years. This totalled over 2,000 homes during the phased construction. The development in Lubbesthorpe, approved in January 2014, is located to land west of Thorpe Astley, divided by the M1.

Blaby District contains several well-known developments in the county, centred around junction 21 of the M1. The most prominent is Fosse Shopping Park, one of the busiest out-of-town shopping centers in the country. The Meridian Leisure Centre, constructed adjacent to and at the same time as the first phase of Thorpe Astley, is located in the district, including a Vue (formerly Warner Village) Cinema, Hollywood Bowl, Nandos, Frankie and Bennys, Chiquitos, Harvester, Pizza Hut and children's play centre.

Large Sainsbury's and Asda Superstores are also placed next to Fosse Park and the Junction 21 area. Business parks also adorn the gateway into Leicester; Grove Business Park's entrance is less than one mile from the motorway junction and is home to Mattioli Woods, British Gas, Topps Tiles and the Leicester Marriott Hotel. Meridian Business Park is next to both Thorpe Astley and the Meridian Leisure Centre, also houses several well-known businesses including Makro, Sytner, Samworth Brothers and Southern Fire and Rescue Station, the only such station located within the district.

Demographics

As demonstrated Blaby district has undergone rapid growth since the middle of the last century, and this will undoubtedly continue as projected especially in light of New Lubbesthorpe in development since around 2015 to the west of the City of Leicester.

Blaby District Council

Like many other shire districts, authority over Blaby District is shared between the district council and the county council. Areas of responsibility of the district council include local planning, building control, council housing, refuse collection, recycling, and some leisure services and parks.

The district council is made up of 39 councillors who are elected every four years; the last election took place in May 2019.

The composition of the council is as follows:

Parishes
Aston Flamville
Blaby, Braunstone Town
Cosby, Countesthorpe, Croft
Elmesthorpe, Enderby
Glen Parva, Glenfield
Huncote
Kilby, Kirby Muxloe
Leicester Forest East, Leicester Forest, Lubbesthorpe
Narborough
Potters Marston
Sapcote, Sharnford, Stoney Stanton
Thurlaston
Whetstone, Wigston Parva

Premises
Blaby District Council's main offices are on Desford Road in Narborough. The old part of the building was formerly a house called the Old Rectory, which had previously served as the rectory for the nearby All Saints Church. The house was bought in 1936 for £4,250 by Blaby Rural District Council to serve as its headquarters and has been significantly extended since then.

Arms

References

External links

Blaby District Council

 
Non-metropolitan districts of Leicestershire